Lucas Steijn (born August 1, 1986) is a Dutch former basketball player. Standing at 6 ft 10 in (2.08 m), Steijn usually plays as center.

Professional career
In the 2013–14 season, Steijn played his first professional season with BC Apollo from Amsterdam. He made the DBL All-Rookie Team, after averaging 10.8 points, 6.3 rebounds in 25.4 minutes per game.

In September 2014, Steijn signed with Challenge Sports Rotterdam.

References

External links
Statistics and profile at eurobasket.com
Dutch Basketball League Profile 

1986 births
Living people
Apollo Amsterdam players
Centers (basketball)
Dutch Basketball League players
Dutch expatriate basketball people in the United States
Dutch men's basketball players
Idaho State Bengals men's basketball players
Junior college men's basketball players in the United States
People from Muiden
Feyenoord Basketball players
Sportspeople from North Holland